Torero Stadium is a 6,000-seat multi-purpose stadium on the west coast of the United States, located on the campus of the University of San Diego in San Diego, California. Opened  in 1961, it serves as the home of the school's football and soccer teams, San Diego Loyal SC of the USL Championship, and the former home of the San Diego Legion of Major League Rugby.

It also served as the home stadium of National Women's Soccer League (NWSL) expansion side San Diego Wave FC for most of its inaugural 2022 season before the team moved to San Diego State University's new Snapdragon Stadium, which opened in September 2022.

Facilities and renovations
The South stands feature approximately 1,100 bleacher seats with backs and with press box facilities. The East and North stands are all bleacher seating – the North stands hold about 3,000 fans and the stands behind the East end hold approximately 1,900.

The stadium underwent two phases of renovation to host the WUSA San Diego Spirit. Over $3.5 million was spent to enlarge the seating areas and add spectator comforts. 
In 2001, the installation of the upgraded lighting system took place, giving Torero illumination for night events. The final steps included the paving of the pedestrian walkway that curves around three-quarters of the stadium and the installation of a new sound system and a video board and scoreboard.

The stadium was planned to undergo renovations in advance of hosting the San Diego Loyal SC team in 2020 to expand the venue to a desired 8,000 seats, however as of 2021 no additions had been made to the seating bowl.

The stadium hosted the San Diego Wave FC, who began play in 2022.

Former tenants and events

Torero has hosted Major League Soccer and Liga MX exhibition games for the Los Angeles Galaxy, Club Tijuana, Toronto FC and Chivas USA. The stadium was the former home of the San Diego Breakers rugby team. 
The U.S. women's national soccer team has also played friendlies at the stadium. The WUSA San Diego Spirit women's soccer team played at Torero from 2001 to 2003. Torero hosted the 2012 women's college cup soccer tournament.

Since 2002, the venue has hosted The First 4 men's college lacrosse invitational. The New England Patriots used the stadium as their practice facility for the week leading up to their game with the San Diego Chargers on December 7, .

See also
 List of NCAA Division I FCS football stadiums

References

External links

 

College football venues
College soccer venues in California
American football venues in California
Rugby union stadiums in San Diego
Major League Rugby stadiums
San Diego Legion
San Diego Toreros football
Soccer venues in California
Sports venues in San Diego
Defunct National Premier Soccer League stadiums
Sports venues completed in 1961
1961 establishments in California